Corus costiger is a species of beetle in the family Cerambycidae. It was described by Quedenfeldt in 1883.

References

costiger
Beetles described in 1883